is the Japanese word for hermaphroditism, which is also used in a broader sense for androgyny.

Beyond Japan, the term has come to be used to describe a commonly pornographic genre of eroge, manga, and anime, which includes characters that show primary sexual characteristics from both females and males. In today's language, it refers almost exclusively to characters who have an overall feminine body, but have both female and male primary genitalia (although testicles are not always present, while breasts, a penis, and a vagina are). The term is also often abbreviated as futa(s), which is also used as a generalized term for the works themselves.

Historic origins

Japanese folk religion created diverse fantasies related to sexual characteristics. Gary Leupp adds that the origins might even reach back to the origins of Buddhism, since the deities would not necessarily have a fixed or determinable gender.

Likewise, the belief spread that some people could change their gender depending on the lunar phase. The term  was coined to describe such beings.  Japanese traditional clothing, which made distinguishing men from women more difficult, as in other cultures, presumably might have had an influence on this development. To restrict women from accessing prohibited areas and to avoid smuggling by hiding items in the belt bag, guard posts were assigned to perform body checks. Historical records indicate that guards liked to joke about this matter quite frequently, resulting in various stories and even poems. Whether anatomical anomalies, such as clitoromegaly or unusual physical development, led to these assumptions remains an open question.

Until 1644, when onnagata actors were required to adopt male hairstyles regardless of the gender they were portraying, actors playing characters such as female warriors capitalized on the interest in the futanari quality, which was common in both samurai and commoner society.

In anime and manga

Originally, the Japanese language referred to any character or real person that possessed masculine and feminine traits as futanari. This changed in the 1990s, as drawn futanari characters became more popular in anime and manga. Today, the term commonly refers to fictional (drawn) female or female-looking hermaphrodite characters. Futanari is also used as the term for a specific genre within hentai-related media (pornographic anime or manga) that depicts such characters.

Origins
American transgender pornography that was introduced to Japan influenced the earliest futanari works, which were drawn by artists including Kitamimaki Kei. In the late 1980s, editor Yōichi Terada collected futanari dōjinshi in published anthologies such as Shemale Collection. Futanari manga became popular in the 1990s and quickly became a part of the industry, cross-pollinating with multiple genres. Toshiki Yui's Hot Tails has been described as the best-known example of the genre in the West.

In anime aimed at a broad audience, the gender bender or cross-dressing storylines have always been popular. Popular examples include anime such as Ranma ½, Kämpfer, and Futaba-kun Change! (in which the main character changes from male to female), and I My Me! Strawberry Eggs (which takes on a more cross-dressing theme). The light novel series and anime series Our Home's Fox Deity features a female fox deity who often appears as a male human.

See also
 Agdistis
 Ardhanarishvara
 Hermaphroditus
 Intersex
 Pseudo-penis
 True hermaphroditism

References

Further reading

External links

Androgyny
Anime and manga terminology
Stock characters in anime and manga
Japanese sex terms
Japanese words and phrases
Intersex in fiction
Transgender pornography